The 2023 World Short Track Speed Skating Championships were held from 10 to 12 March 2023 in Seoul, South Korea.
Seoul were originally scheduled to host the 2020 Championships, but they were cancelled due to the COVID-19 Pandemic.

Medal summary

Medal table

Men

Women

Mixed

References

External links
Official ISU Event Page
Official website
Results book

2020s in Seoul
World Championships
World Short Track Speed Skating Championships
Sports competitions in Seoul
International speed skating competitions hosted by South Korea
World Short Track Speed Skating Championships
World Short Track Speed Skating Championships